Agonopterix glabrella is a moth in the family Depressariidae. It was described by Turati in 1921. It is found in Morocco.

References

Moths described in 1921
Agonopterix
Moths of Africa